The Sicilian pond turtle (Emys trinacris) is a species of turtle in the family Emydidae. The species is endemic to Sicily.

Etymology
The specific name, trinacris, is from the Greek word Trinacria, meaning "three-pointed", the earliest known name for the island of Sicily.

Subspecies
There are no subspecies of E. trinacris that are recognized as being valid.

Description
E. trinacris is a small turtle. The carapace is dark, and the plastron is yellow. E. trinacris differs from E. orbicularis by its distinct mitochondrial DNA.

Habitat
The preferred habitat of E. trinacris is freshwater in ponds, lakes, rivers, and swamps.

References

Bibliography

Further reading
Fritz, Uwe; Fattizzo, Tiziano; Guicking, Daniela; Tripepi, Sandro; Pennisi, Maria Grazia; Lenk, Peter; Joger, Ulrich; Wink, Michael (2005). "A new cryptic species of pond turtle from southern Italy, the hottest spot in the range of the genus Emys (Reptilia, Testudines, Emydidae)". Zoologica Scripta 34 (4): 351–371. (Emys trinacris, new species).

Emys
Endemic fauna of Italy
Fauna of Sicily
Turtles of Europe
Reptiles described in 2005